Château du Plessis-Bourré is a château in the Loire Valley in France, situated in the commune of Écuillé in the Maine-et-Loire department. 
Built in less than 5 years from 1468 to 1472 by Finance Minister Jean Bourré, the principal advisor to King Louis XI. The château has not been modified externally since its construction and still has a fully working drawbridge. It was classified as a Monument historique in 1931.

The château was purchased in 1911 by Henry Vaïsse who, when he died in 1956, bequeathed it to his nephew, François Reille-Soult, Duke of Dalmatie, descendant of the marshals of the French empire Soult, Reille and Masséna. 

In 1978, Antoinette de Ferrières de Sauvebœuf, born de Croix, granddaughter of the Duke of Dalmatie, and her spouse Bruno de Ferrières de Sauvebœuf took the responsibility of heading the renovation and maintenance of the château until 2009. They lived there with their three children, Victor (1976), Matthias (1978), and Jean-Baptiste (1980), for 31 years, the longest stay of a single family since 1473.

Since 2010, it has been inhabited by descendants of François Reille-Soult of Dalmatie and managed by Aymeric d'Anthenaise and Jean-François Reille-Soult de Dalmatie.

The Château du Plessis-Bourré has been the location for numerous films, including:

 Peau d'Âne (1970) by Jacques Demy
 Louis XI by J.C. Lubtchansky 
 Jeanne d'Arc (1989 telefilm) by Pierre Badel
 Le Bossu (1997) by Philippe de Broca 
 Fanfan la Tulipe (2003) by Gérard Krawczyk
 La Reine et le Cardinal (telefilm)
 The Princess of Montpensier (2009) by Bertrand Tavernier
  Louis XI, Le Pouvoir Fracassé (2010) by Henri Helman with Jacques Perrin

References

External links
 Château du Plessis-Bourré - official site

Châteaux in Maine-et-Loire
Castles in Pays de la Loire
Historic house museums in Pays de la Loire
Museums in Maine-et-Loire
Monuments historiques of Pays de la Loire